Limeira is a city in the eastern part of the Brazilian state of São Paulo. The population is 308,482 (2020 est.) in an area of 581 km2. The elevation is 588 m. It is 154 km from São Paulo, the state capital, and 1011 km from Brasilia, Brazil's capital. The city can be easily reached from São Paulo by two highways: Rodovia Anhanguera and Rodovia dos Bandeirantes.

Once an important and strategical pole of coffee culture, Limeira was also known as the "Brazilian orange capital" due to the great citrus production that occurred in the past, although now the main crop cultivated in the city is the sugar cane. Afterwards, it became recognized by its new plated jewelry and semi-jewelry industry which attract customers from all over the world, giving the city the title of "Brazil's plated jewellery capital". There are more than 450 companies that are responsible for half of Brazil's exports in this sector.

There is a famous farm located in Limeira, Fazenda Ibicaba, that belonged to Nicolau Pereira de Campos Vergueiro, who brought the first immigrants from Europe, especially from Germany, Portugal, Switzerland and Belgium, to replace the enslaved African-Brazilian workers, which was basically a government effort to "bleach" the race, as it was feared Brazil would become a "black country". Probably because Northern Europeans preferred to run their own farms rather than to subject themselves to indentured work and the Portuguese tended to work in commerce, Italian immigrants were brought to work the fields. Such immigrant groups were greater in numbers than all the others all over São Paulo state. Northern Europeans and the first Italians to arrive in the country often came with the promise of being granted lands in exchange for their work, but the last ones were treated socially only better than the slaves themselves. The latter, nonetheless, had nowhere to go for jobs as slavery ended and many begged to be rehired for food. The situation of some of them improved when the British installed the railway in the country and gave them prestigious jobs with housing. Today, Limeira is located in a prosperous region in São Paulo State.

History

The history of Limeira begins with the economic exploitation in the state of São Paulo, more precisely in mid-1826, which marks the founding of the region of Limeira. But also includes a period before this year involving a legend which tries to explain the origin of the current name of the city.

Legendary origin

The origin of the name involves a popular myth enshrined in its population. Tradition says that the pioneers used to rest in a guesthouse-situated 150 km from São Paulo, around the river Tatuibi, which the name in Tupi-Guarani means small armadillo. This landing was called Blue Hill Ranch (Rancho Morro Azul) since it was near an elevation that in the distance is seen in shades of blue.

It is said that in 1781 a caravan was headed to the wilds of Araraquara and while passing through Limeira, camped near the stream of the Bladder – Córrego do Bexiga (where today is the Market Model). In this caravan there was a Franciscan, Fr. João das Mercês, which carried a picuá de limas (a kind of lime orange), which claimed to cure and prevent fevers.

But at night he began to feel ill, blaming the limas which he said had been poisoned. Eventually he died during the night and the next day he would have been buried there, along with his Picuá de Lima's that no one wanted to eat because could be poisoned, as he said. Then there would have sprung a lime tree, born from the limes of the Fr. João das Mercês. Years later, the Blue Hill Ranch (Rancho do Morro Azul) would be called the Ranch of the Lime Orange Tree (Rancho de Limeira).

Historical facts

Limeira came in cleared land near the path known as the Picadão de Cuiabá, road flow of troops who were trading and sourcing supplies to the mines of Mato Grosso.

From the observation of standard trees (indicating the fertility of the land) that existed along the road in still virgin lands, planters and noble farmers that were living in ‘Cidade da Constituição’ (town of the Constitution, today Piracicaba), Itu, Porto Feliz and Atibaia, know where the best lands were and managed to gain allotments from the provincial government. This occurred from 1799 to 1820 in the region.

The beginning of the village took place then with the installation of mills, the coming of slaveholders and slaves and also with the expulsion of squatters who had in the area. It is possible to observe that, by the census of 1822, in the Town of New Constitution (Piracicaba), the region of Morro Azul and Tatuibi (both Limeira) had a population of 951 free people and 546 slaves.

The roads that link these properties to the capital were precarious making Nicolau Pereira de Campos Vergueiro to lead a group of farmers like Manuel Bento de Barros, José Ferraz de Campos and others to ask the provincial government to construct a road that facilitates the flow of production of the mills in the region of Piracicaba and Limeira.

This road was opened in 1826, while around it came a housing project, the Freguesia de Nossa Senhora das Dores do Tatuibi (Parish of Our Lady of Sorrows of Tatuibi), formalized by provincial law on December 9, 1930. The traffic of the road facilitated the growth of trade and other activities and marks the founding of the municipality of Limeira. The core was built on land donated by Captain Luis Manuel Bastos da Cunha, he is considered the founder of the city.

In 1842 the region was elevated to village, but only in 1844 the city council land was installed and Limeira gained its first president, Manuel José de Carvalho. Limeira was elevated to city on April 18, 1863. On April 20, 1875 it was created the county of Limeira. Officially, the city's anniversary is September 15 and it is considered to be founded in 1826.

Origin of the private-sponsored European immigration

Limeira is one of the first cities in Brazil to receive private-sponsored European immigration. Through the pioneering effort undertaken by the then owner of the Mill Ibicaba in 1840, Nicolau Pereira de Campos Vergueiro (known as Senator Vergueiro), eighty Portuguese came to work on its lands. This was the first positive experience in developing the partnership system in Brazil.

The immigrants would replace the slave labor, still in use at this time, but they would receive benefits, unlike the slaves. In 1846, Germans came to work in Ibicaba and Senator Vergueiro became an important figure in replacement of slave labor with free European labor.

The farm Ibicaba was during a period the largest producer of coffee in Brazil. Today it is an important historical ensemble formed by its headquarters, slave quarters, terraces, dams and other facilities as part of the set of the city's historic farms.

Geography
Limeira is Located in the eastern part of the Brazilian state of São Paulo. It is 154 km from São Paulo, the state capital, and 1011 km from Brasilia, Brazil's capital. The city can be easily reached from São Paulo by two highways: Rodovia Anhanguera and Rodovia dos Bandeirantes.

The elevation is 588 m.

Climate 
Limeira experiences a humid subtropical climate (Köppen climate classification Cwa), with distinctive wet and dry seasons lasting from October to March and from April to September, respectively, and warm to hot temperatures year-round. The average temperature is 19.8 °C (67.6 °F) and yearly precipitation stands at 1300.5 mm (51.2 in). On 17 October 2014, temperatures in the city reached a record high of 38.6 °C (101.4 °F) and its coldest day was 9 July 2011, with a low of 0.1 °C (32.1 °F).

Economy

Industry

By the year of 1850, agricultural equipment started to be produced in Limeira and during the Paraguayan War instruments to the soldiers were also produced. Between the years of 1907 and 1922 important industries, such as 'Chapéus Prada' (1907), 'Café Kühl' (1920) and 'Indústria de Papel Santa Cruz' (1922) started their production in Limeira. However, it was after the 1940s that Limeira became well known for its industry.

Between the 1940s and 1970s many citrus companies started producing orange and orange juice in Limeira to export to inside and outside of Brazil, including to USA and Europe, this commerce gave to the city the title of 'The City of Orange'. Citrobrasil (1940) and Citrosuco (1966) were the biggest companies in Limeira in orange production, however when the United States started its policy to protect and encourage the nacional industry of orange in California, the production of orange in Limeira collapsed. Also after the Second World War the automotive industries took place in the city with 'Freios Varga' (today TRW) in 1945 and 'Rodas Fumagalli' in 1946.

After the 1970s, the industrial section area started to grow faster and some multinational companies came to Limeira, such as: Ajinomoto; the American company Rockwell bought Fumagalli in 1974, and 'Freios Varga' joined the English Group Lucas in 2000. Recently, some Japanese and  Korean automotive companies have settled in Limeira, for example: Yacchyio do Brasil, Stanley, Mando, DAS and Faurecia, which is a French company that has been building a new plant in the city. In 2011, Samsung invested U$300 million in building an industry in Limeira.

Limeira is also known for its new plated jewelry and semi-jewelry industry which attract customers from all over the world, giving the city the title of "Brazil's plated jewelry capital."

The city has been trying to become more attractive to industries related to incentive programs. This policy tries to reduce the unemployment and the informal jobs, which has been growing together with its population. Part of the population works in cities nearby, including Piracicaba and Americana. According to IBGE (Brazilian Institute of Geography and Statistics), Limeira has a GDP of R$5.6 billion (2010), around U$3.6 billion. The industrial sector accounts for approximately 50% of registered jobs in the city. Thus, Limeira took its industrial vocation with its incentive program, which guided the development and implementation of its current industrial park.

The city has a number of favorable conditions for their development, such as the extension of Highway Bandeirantes (Rodovia dos Bandeirantes), the implementation of the Tietê-Paraná waterway, and the installation of the Brazil-Bolivia gas pipeline.

All these factors, combined with their potential and possibilities, specified multiple paths for the development of the industrial sector of the city: 
 Limeira is inserted in the Campinas region, an area marked by a strong industrial concentration and has a GDP that is larger than many states in the country, such as Minas Gerais and Rio Grande do Sul, for example.
 In the formal economy has approximately 1,000 industries, employing more than 22,000 registered employees, with a significant share of skilled labor.

The size of the business is diversified, with a production quite varied, including brake systems, automotive wheels, exhausts, metal products, machinery for processing of agricultural products, paper and cardboard packaging, hats, and more. Limeira also has the largest concentration of production of machine tools in Latin America and the largest sugar refining industry in South America.

Currently, the largest industries in operation are:

 Ajinomoto Interamericana Ind. Com. Ltda. - Food
 CPkelco, Huber Co. - Chemical, food, Citrus
 ZF/TRW - Brakes - Truck and Car steering systems
 Invicta - Machine tools for wood
 Mastra Indústria e Comércio - Automotive Exhaust System
 Metal Leve S.A. (Corporation) - Pistons for Engines
 Arvin Meritor, Divisão LVS (antiga Rockwell Fumagalli) - Wheels
 Newton Indústria e Comércio - Presses and Guillotines
 Papirus Indústria de Papel S.A. (Corporation) - Paper
 Ripasa S.A. Celulose Papel - Cellulose, Paper
 Samsung - Electronics 
 Bebidas Poty - Beverages and Soft Drinks

The main industries in the business of jewelry in the city are:

 Galle Indústria e Comércio de bijuterias - semi jewelry
 Irmãos Gullo - jewelry and semi jewelry
 Jóias Degan - jewelry and semi jewelry

Commerce and service sector

The commercial sector has more than 4,000 stores and 3,000 services business. The implementation of the Shopping Center, in the 1980s, along the Rodovia Anhanguera (Anhanguera Road), came to further boost the development of the tertiary sector in the city. Allied to this and following the world trend of globalization and outsourcing observed the emergence of many companies included in the modernization process, which now act as support for the industries of the city. After the 1990s, the mall closed, but there is still a shopping mall located in downtown (Shopping Patio Limeira).

In the area of public services, Limeira presents itself as home to several organizations and government agencies in regional performance as the Caixa Economica Federal, Delegacia da Receita Federal, IBGE, CETESB, Delegacia de Ensino do Estado, Inspetoria Fiscal da Secretaria da Fazenda do Estado, Comando da Polícia Militar and Secretary of Agriculture of the State of São Paulo; there is also private institutions, such as CIESP, SENAI, SESI, SENAC e JUCESP.

The main concern is the competition around the city. There is a big competition from neighbor cities because of diversity, variety and comfort. Sometimes, people prefer to travel to Campinas or Piracicaba for consumption.

Number of companies in Limeira by sector (IBGE 2001):
 Agriculture and forestry - 37 companies
 Fishery - 1 company
 Extractive Industries - 10 companies
 Manufacturing Industry - 1266 companies
 Production and Distribution of electricity, Gas and Water - 3 companies
 Construction - 170 companies
 Trade, repair of motor vehicles, personal effects and household - 4,088 companies
 Accommodation and Food - 605 companies
 Transport, Storage and Communications - 238 companies
 Financial Intermediation - 73 companies
 Real Estate activities, Rentals and Business Services - 779 companies
 Public Administration, Defense and Social Security - 6 companies
 Education - 106 companies
 Health and Social Services - 114 companies
 Other Collective, Social and Personal - 405 companies

Agriculture
Rural production remains strongly marked by the sugar cane (Ethanol production) and orange/citrus, which has remained virtually unchanged over the past two decades, with a slight decline. The sugar cane production reaches more than 1 million tons per year and citrus (orange, lemon and tangerine), more than 1.4 billion units. On a smaller scale for production there are avocados, corn, rice and beans. The city is considered the first producer of São Paulo citrus industry, and it is recognized by its production of seedlings, especially citrus.

During the last three decades, Limeira gained a large center of commerce of plants and seedlings on Geada, located on Limeira-Piracicaba Road, approximately km 120. The biggest companies are Félix Plantas, Bonin Plantas, Dierberger  and Chácara Roseira,

Media

There are two daily newspapers in the city: "A Gazeta de Limeira", created in 1831, and "O Jornal de Limeira", created in 1982. But many newspapers are weekly, such as "Folha de Limeira", "Folha Cidade Interior", "Folha Cidade Gospel" and "Cidade Mais". 
Furthermore, there is a monthly circulation magazine called "Expressão Regional" and a bimonthly circulation magazine, the "Revista Estereosom."

The TV channels that are well known to provide local programming are "TV Jornal", channel 39, and "TV Mix".

Health

Limeira has five main hospitals. Two of them are charitable and receive public financial and management assistance:
 Santa Casa de Misericórdia
 Sociedade Operária Humanitária

The other three are private:
 Hospital Unimed
 Hospital Medical
 Hospital Dia (formerly "Hospital Filantrópico Beneficência Limeirense", which was closed and taken over by the Santa Casa de Misericórdia).

The Brazilian public health system – SUS – operates within the Santa Casa de Misericórdia, which is one of the largest public hospitals in the countryside of São Paulo State, serving currently patients in 92 cities in São Paulo and southern Minas Gerais. Limeira currently achieved a higher HDI and it has its medical sector very developed compared to the others along the country, and also by comparing to the hospitals over Latin America. There are also visits by the SUS to the neighborhoods if they are needed, several Basic Health Units (Unidades Básicas de Saúde) spread throughout the city can provide health care to any citizen in their own house if they want.

Limeira also has public dentist assistance provided by the "Unidade Básica de Saúde", UBS, mainly with private characteristics, and a special public health center specialized in children.

Sport
A.A. Internacional is a traditional football club based in Limeira, along with Independente F.C. The city's biggest stadium is the Major José Levy Sobrinho stadium, built in 1977.

The city's basketball team is Associação Limeirense de Basquete, which plays in the Novo Basquete Brasil and the Liga Sudamericana. Its home arena is the Ginásio "Vô" Lucato.

Twin towns – sister cities
 Saga

See also
 European immigration to Brazil
 German Brazilian
 Piracicaba
 Ajinomoto

References

Bibliography

Notes

External links

 Cityhall official website
 State of São Paulo official website

 
Populated places established in 1863